The 1982 UMass Minutemen football team represented the University of Massachusetts Amherst in the 1982 NCAA Division I-AA football season as a member of the Yankee Conference. The team was coached by Bob Pickett and played its home games at Alumni Stadium in Hadley, Massachusetts. The 1982 season was notable as it was the last Conference Championship for Bob Pickett as coach of the Minutemen. UMass finished the season with a record of 5–6 overall and 3–2 in conference play, winning the Yankee Conference championship.

Schedule

References

UMass
UMass Minutemen football seasons
Yankee Conference football champion seasons
UMass Minutemen football